Felix Bernstein (born May 20, 1992) is a performance artist, video artist, writer, and cultural critic. Bernstein was born in New York City to poet Charles Bernstein and artist Susan Bee, and attended Bard College, graduating in 2013.

Bernstein's art includes narrative films, poetry, short YouTube videos, durational performance videos, and live performances. In his work, he often plays characters based on cultural icons including: Amy Winehouse, Lamb Chop (puppet), Antony Hegerty, Leopold Brant (a parody of Peter Brant II), and Lady Gaga.

Work
Bernstein's first video was a satirical coming out video for YouTube made in clown make-up in 2008. 
In 2012, his first narrative film, Unchained Melody, premiered at Anthology Film Archives, featuring his parents Charles Bernstein and Susan Bee, the poet Cole Heinowitz, and the singer Shelley Hirsch. 
In 2012, together with Gabe Rubin, he co-performed and co-directed Art & Language / Red Krayola's opera Victorine at the 2012 Whitney Biennial. Felix Bernstein & Gabe Rubin make music, stage shows, and videos around themes of impersonation, poly-sexuality, and persona. In January 2015, Rubin and Bernstein debuted the stage show Bieber Bathos Elegy at the Whitney Museum of American Art. In February 2016, Nightboat published Bernstein's first poetry collection, Burn Book. His most recent work with Rubin, titled "Folie à Deux" (2018), will be featured at the David Lewis gallery.

Writing and criticism
Bernstein's work has been described as "zany" and "confessional."
  
Bernstein's cultural criticism has been published in The Brooklyn Rail, Htmlgiant, The Volta, The Believer, Coldfront, Lemonhound, Hyperallergic, The Fanzine, and The Boston Review. 

Bernstein's article-turned-book "Notes on Post-Conceptual Poetry" is a critical and ambivalent survey of language poetry, conceptual poetry and the art in their lineage. Bernstein's central argument is that there has been a shift from language poetry's death of the author to conceptual poetry's death of the writerly to post-conceptual poetry's death of reading. The Goldsmith aesthetic, along with that of postpostmodernism in general (Queer Theory, Speculative Realism, Metamodernism, Gaga Feminism, Alternative literature, New Sincerity), has brought a decline in incisive and dialectical criticality, an overemphasis on social networks, slapdash viral superstars, and a hyper-mediated institutionalization of affect through an unconscious structuralism that masks itself as a romantic return to sheer materiality and the great outdoors.

According to Capilano Review,

Drawing on thinkers from Deleuze to Lacan to Love to Ngai to Badiou to Barthes to Perloff, and combining a Zizekian X-ray vision with the biting 'you can't scare me' of youth, Notes constitutes Bernstein's irruption into / refusal of the institutional avant-garde.

In the New York Times, Holland Cotter called Bernstein's "blistering cultural criticism," one of the best things in 2015 art. Notes was selected by Seth Price as the best book of 2015 in Artforum. Price wrote,

Bernstein's book is basically a symptomology report, which is one definition of an artwork. Symptoms include youth culture, the avant-garde, queer theory, alt lit, and social media…Keeping a space open can be a political act, and that's what Bernstein's doing with his writing, or his persona, and maybe there's no difference. It's hard to say what this space is, but you could call it a space of trouble.

Publications 
 Notes on Post-Conceptual Poetry. Insert Blanc Press. 2015.
 Burn Book. Nightboat. 2016.

External links
 Felix Bernstein Skype Reading.  Poetry will be made by all. 
 Felix Bernstein Youtube Channel
 Boyland. Felix Bernstein & Gabe Rubin. Brooklyn Film Festival, 2015.
 Bieber Bathos Elegy. Whitney Museum of American Art.
 The Shame of Shamelessness. Interview with Bernstein. Believer.

References

American performance artists
Poets from New York (state)
Gay Jews
Bard College alumni
American gay writers
Artists from New York City
American literary critics
American male poets
Gay poets
American video artists
21st-century American non-fiction writers
Critics of postmodernism
American YouTubers
American LGBT poets
1992 births
Living people
American gay artists
American male non-fiction writers
21st-century American poets
Entertainment-related YouTube channels
21st-century American male writers